Carmelita Madriaga, known as Carmen Costa, (5 July 1920 – 25 April 2007) was a Brazilian singer and composer.

Biography
Born in Trajano de Moraes, in the state of Rio de Janeiro, Carmen Costa moved to the state capital at age 15, where she worked as a maid at the house of singer Francisco Alves. She started her musical career encouraged by Alves, inviting her to sing at parties and to participate in radio contests.

Carmen won the amateur singing radio contest presented by Ary Barroso. She became a professional singer, presenting herself in a duo with composer Henricão.

Her first hit was Está Chegando a Hora, a version of  Mexican song Cielito Lindo, in the 1940s. In 1945, Costa married the American national Hans Van Koehler and moved with him to the United States. She spent a season in  Los Angeles and, in 1962  sang at the Bossa Nova at Carnegie Hall concert, with Antonio Carlos Jobim, Stan Getz and João Gilberto, among others.

In 1950 she came back to Brazil, where she met composer Mirabeau Pinheiro, with whom she lived for five years and had her only daughter, Silésia. They worked together on songs like Cachaça não é água (being accused of plagiarism) and Obsessão.

The singer also participated in several films, such as "Pra Lá de Boa" (1949), "Carnaval em Marte" (1955), "Depois eu conto" (1956) and "Vou Te Contá" (1958).

In 2003, the City Council of Rio de Janeiro had approved an initiative project of the Museum of the Republic and she was proclaimed Brazilian cultural heritage.  For the occasion, she composed the song "Tombamento", which he sang for the Minister of Culture, Gilberto Gil .

On June 2, 2004, in Rio de Janeiro, she participated in the re-inauguration of Rádio Nacional, where she met  former president Luiz Inácio Lula da Silva, together  with the " Cantoras do Rádio " (Radio singers), a generation of artists revealed on Radio National. Emilinha Borba, Marlene, Ademilde Fonseca, Adelaide Chiozzo, and Carmélia Alves.

She died at Lourenço Jorge Hospital, in Rio de Janeiro, at age 86, after a few days in hospital. She had chronic kidney disease and cardiac arrest at 6:00 am on April 25, 2007.

Tribute
On July 5, 2016, Google celebrated her 96th birthday with a Google Doodle.

Discography 
 Onde está o dinheiro?/Não dou motivo (1939) Odeon 78
 Dance mais um bocado/Não quero conselho (1940) Columbia 78
 Eu sambo meu nego/Não posso viver sem você (1941) Columbia 78
 Está chegando a hora/Só vendo que beleza (1942) Odeon 78
 Depois que ela partiu(Com Henricão)/Formosa morena (1942) Odeon 78
 Carmilito/Festa na roça (1942) Victor 78
 Caramba/A festa é boa (1943) Victor 78
 A coisa melhorou/Já é de madrugada (1943) Victor 78
 Estrela D'Alva (1943) Victor 78
 Quero ver-te uma vez mais/Velho realejo (1943) Victor 78
 Chorei de dor/Não me abandone (1944) Victor 78
 Madalena/Não há (1944) Victor 78
 Chamego/Casinha da Marambaia (1944) Victor 78
 Garota esportiva/A mulher do Lino (1944) Victor 78
 Outro céu/Manduca (1944) Victor 78
 Sarapaté/Ciúme (1945) Victor 78
 E não tarda a amanhecer/Bilu-bilu (1945) Victor 78
 No lesco lesco/Não posso aceitar (1945) Victor 78
 Siga seu destino/Meu barraco (1946) Victor 78
 Sonhei que estava em Pernambuco (1949) Star 78
 Dona Juliana/Chiquinha (1949) Star 78
 Se é pecado eu não sei/Cetim para as baianas (1951) Star 78
 Busto calado/Coco duro (1952) Star 78
 Tô te esperando/Quando chega a noite (1952) Star 78
 Não me deixe/Tô te esperando (1952) Star 78
 Cachaça (Com Colé) (1952) Copacabana 78
 Defesa/Resposta (1953) Copacabana 78.
 Maria Pé de Boi/Batendo pé (1953) Copacabana 78
 Eu sou a outra/Não pode mexer (1953) Copacabana 78
 Tranca rua/Mais tempero (1954) Copacabana 78
 Tio biruta/Mexerica (1954) Copacabana 78
 Canção da alma/Quase (1954) Copacabana 78
 Não é só vestir saia/Manchetes de jornal (1954) Copacabana 78
 Busto calado/Coco duro (1954) Copacabana 78
 Sacode a lapela/Operário (1955) Copacabana 78
 Tem nego bebo aí/Até amanhã (1955) Copacabana 78
 Gente cega/Reencontro (1955) Copacabana 78
 Presidiário/Se você me quer bem (1955) Copacabana 78
 Sei de tudo/Obsessão (1955) Copacabana 78
 Começo de vida/A morena sou eu (1955) Copacabana 78
 Drama da favela/Acacamauê (1956) Copacabana 78
 Na paz de Deus/Deixa o cabrito berrar (1956) Copacabana 78
 Amor barato/Se eu fosse contar (1956) Copacabana 78
 Don Charles/Só você (1956) Copacabana 78
 Jarro da saudade/Está bem (1956) Copacabana 78
 Gato escaldado/Nem só de pão (1957) Copacabana 78
 Jarro da saudade (1957) Copacabana 78
 Facundo/Drama de amor (1957) Copacabana 78
 Cai sereno/Palácio improvisado (1957) Copacabana 78
 Carmen Costa nº 2 (1957) Copacabana LP
 Indecisão/Como eu chorei (1958) Copacabana 78
 Lágrimas de sangue/Augusto Calheiros (1958) RCA Victor 78
 Aquela noite/Está chegando a hora (1959) RCA Victor 78
 Se eu morrer amanhã/Cretcheu (Amor) (1961) RCA Victor 78
 Marcha do cordão da Bola Preta/Se eu morrer amanhã (1961) RCA Victor 78
 Eu sou a outra/Quase (1963) Copacabana 78
 Ensinando a bossa nova/Melancolia (1963) Copacabana 78
 O samba no Brasil/Tem bobo pra tudo (1963) RCA Victor 78
 Não fique triste/Mal que faz bem (1964) Copacabana 78
 Embaixatriz do samba (1964) Copacabana LP
 Ziriguidum no Sambão (1971) RCA Candem LP
 Trinta anos depois (1973) RCA Victor LP
 A Música de Paulo Vanzolini - Carmen Costa e Paulo Marques (1974) Discos Marcus Pereira LP
 Carmen Costa (1980) Continental LP
 Agnaldo Timóteo & Carmen Costa - Na Galeria do amor (1981) EMI/Odeon LP
 Benditos, Hinos e Ladainhas (1983) Alvorada/Continental LP
 Tantos caminhos (1996) Som Livre CD
 Bis Cantores do Rádio - Carmen Costa (2000) EMI CD

References

2007 deaths
Música Popular Brasileira musicians
1920 births
Women in Latin music